The voter turnout in 2000 assembly polls was 62.6%.

Background
Between 1990 and 2000, Bihar's per capita income, according to a World Bank estimate, fell from  1,373 to  1,289. Power consumption in Bihar went down from 84 KWH to 60 KWH and it registered the lowest number of Internet users among Indian states. As per a Business Today -Gallup survey in December 1999, Bihar was the worst state for investment.

In 1999 Lok Sabha elections Rashtriya Janata Dal received a setback at the hand of BJP+JD(U) combine. The new coalition emerged leading in 199 out of 324 assembly constituencies and it was widely believed that in the forthcoming election to Bihar state assembly elections, the Lalu-Rabri rule will come to an end. The RJD had fought the election in an alliance with the Congress but the coalition didn't work making state leadership of Congress believe that the maligned image of Lalu Prasad after his name was drawn in the Fodder Scam had eroded his support base. Consequently, Congress decided to fight the 2000 assembly elections alone.

The RJD had to be satisfied with the communist parties as coalition partners but the seat-sharing conundrum in the camp of National Democratic Alliance made Kumar pull his Samta Party out of the Sharad Yadav and Ram Vilas Paswan faction of the Janata Dal.
Differences also arose between the BJP and Kumar as the latter wanted to be projected as the Chief Minister of Bihar but the former was not in favour. Even Paswan also wanted to be a CM face. The Muslims and OBCs were too divided in their opinion. A section of Muslims, which included the poor communities like Pasmanda were of the view that Lalu only strengthened upper Muslims like Shaikh, Sayyid and Pathans and they were in search of new options.

Yadav also alienated other dominant backward castes like Koeri and Kurmi since his projection as the saviour of Muslims. It is argued by Sanjay Kumar that the belief that, "the dominant OBCs like the twin caste of Koeri-Kurmi will ask for share in power if he (Yadav) seeks their support while the Muslims will remain satisfied with the protection during communal riots only" made Yadav neglect them. Moreover, the divisions in both the camps made the political atmosphere in the state a charged one in which many parties were fighting against each other with no visible frontiers. JD(U) and BJP were fighting against each other on some of the seats and so was the Samta Party.

Results

List of Participating Political Parties in Bihar Assembly Election in 2000
Bihar Assembly Election Results in 2000

National Parties

State Parties

Registered (Unrecognised) Parties

Incomplete list (Need more experts from India on this section)

Elected members

Government Formation
The result was a setback for the BJP, which in media campaigns was emerging with a massive victory. RJD emerged as the single largest party. In March 2000, Nitish Kumar was elected Chief Minister of Bihar for the first time at the behest of the Vajpayee Government in the centre. NDA and allies had 151 MLAs whereas Lalu Prasad Yadav had 159 MLAs in the 324 member house. Both alliances were less than the majority mark that is 163. Nitish resigned before he could prove his numbers in the house. He lasted 7 days in the post. With the political manoeuvring of Lalu Yadav, Rabri Devi was sworn in as the Chief Minister again. The media largely failed to gauge the ground level polarisation in Bihar. According to Sanjay Kumar:
 Even after serving imprisonment in connection with the 1997 scam, Lalu seemed to relish his role as the lower-caste jester. He argued that corruption charges against him and his family were the conspiracy of the upper-caste bureaucracy and media elites threatened by the rise of peasant cultivator castes.

References

2000
2000
Bihar